Six French ships of the French Navy have borne the name Océan, after the Ocean:
 The 80-gun ship of the line 
 The 118-gun ship of the line 
 The armoured frigate  (1870)
 An auxiliary ship
 The dreadnought  was renamed to Océan at the end of her career
 The heavy cruiser  was renamed to Océan at the end of her career

French Navy ship names